The Alagnon, also spelled Allagnon, is an  river in south-central France. It is a left tributary of the river Allier. Its source is near the village of Laveissière, near the Plomb du Cantal in the Massif Central. The Alagnon flows generally northeast through the following departments and towns:
 Cantal: Murat, Massiac
 Haute-Loire: Lempdes-sur-Allagnon
 Puy-de-Dôme: Beaulieu

The Alagnon flows into the river Allier at Auzat-la-Combelle.

References

Rivers of France
Rivers of Auvergne-Rhône-Alpes
Rivers of Cantal
Rivers of Haute-Loire
Rivers of Puy-de-Dôme